Second seeds Facundo Bagnis and Máximo González won the title, beating Sergio Galdós and Christian Lindell 6–1, 6–2

Seeds

Draw

Draw

References
 Main Draw

Racket Club Open - Doubles
2016 Doubles